Gramzivost i pohlepa is the sixth studio album by the Serbian garage rock/punk rock band Partibrejkers, released by Hi-Fi Centar in 2002.

Track listing 
All lyrics written by Zoran Kostić. All music written by Nebojša Antonijević.

Personnel 
Partibrejkers
 Nebojša Antonijević "Anton" — guitar, mixed by, producer
 Zoran Kostić "Cane" — vocals

Additional personnel
 Miloš Velimir "Buca" — drums on tracks 1, 3 to 7, 9, 11
 Darko Kurjak — drums on tracks 2, 8, 10
 Miodrag Karjanković "Miša" — bass
 Marin Petrić "Puroni" — percussion
 Bata-Bata — keyboards
 Talent Factory — artwork by [design, idea, photography] - 
 Leonid Pilipović — artwork by [tattoo, calligraphy] - 
 Oliver Jovanović — mastered by
 Vlada Negovanović — producer
 Milan Barković "Bare" — recorded by

References 

 Gramzivost i pohlepa at Discogs

2002 albums
Partibrejkers albums
Hi-Fi Centar albums